Enborne Copse is a  biological Site of Special Scientific Interest west of Newbury in Berkshire.  It is a Nature Conservation Review site.

The current woodland boundary is almost identical to that shown on Rocque's map of Berkshire in 1761, but most of it is now a conifer plantation and only the area designated as an SSSI retains its semi-natural broad leaved woodland.

Flora

The site has the following flora:

Trees

Betula pubescens
Fraxinus
Tilia cordata
Quercus robur
Hazel
Alder
Salix caprea
Viburnum opulus
Sorbus aucuparia
Sambucus nigra
Frangula alnus
Malus sylvestris
Quercus cerris

Other plants

Convallaria majalis
Primula vulgaris
Polygonatum multiflorum
Euphorbia amygdaloides
Lamium galeobdolon
Hyacinthoides non-scripta
Oxalis

References

Sites of Special Scientific Interest in Berkshire
Nature Conservation Review sites